On 15 May 2016, Igor Stachowiak, a 25-year-old man, died while in custody of the Polish police shortly after being tased three times by four law enforcement officers while lying handcuffed on the floor in a toilet room with the lights off in a police station. Stachowiak was also tased twice during his arrest, which occurred after he was misidentified as a fugitive who had escaped police custody two days earlier.

The police officers who took part in Stachowiak's arrest continued to work in the police, with the circumstances of his death remaining relatively unknown, until, one year later, the news channel TVN24 released a documentary about the case, leading to a nationwide media debate in Poland over police brutality and the usage of tasers, and a dismissal of at least eight police officers.

On 21 June 2019, the four suspected officers were convicted of abusing their positions and physical and psychological abuse of Stachowiak. Łukasz Rz. was sentenced to two years and six months in prison, while PawełG., PawełP. and AdamW. were sentenced to two years in prison. The sentences are final and currently served, but as of 2022, cassation appeals are pending in the Supreme Court of Poland.

Incident

Frontczak escapes and Stachowiak is arrested 

On 13 May 2016, 22-year-old Mariusz Frontczak escaped from a police patrol while handcuffed during an attempted arrest to enforce his sentence for the possession of drugs. To recapture the fugitive, a dedicated team was established for this purpose and all police stations in Wrocław were notified.

On the early morning of 15 May 2016 Igor Stachowiak was partying with his friends in Cherry, a nightclub near Wrocław's center. At 5:05 AM, after maundering around the club and bugging the manager, he was led out of the club by security guards. From there he went to the Wrocław's main square, where he continued to wander, bringing the attention of the operator of the city's camera surveillance. Having found Stachowiak matching the description of Frontczak, the operator dispatched two police squad cars.

The first squad car, with two police officers, arrived at 6:06. The officers approached Stachowiak and talked with him for four and half minutes, after which another squad car arrived with two more police officers. Soon after leaving the car, one of the newly arrived officers pulled out handcuffs, and then all the four officers proceeded to arrest Stachowiak, who at that moment however started struggling. The officers had difficulty handcuffing Stachowiak, so at 6:12, officer Łukasz Rz. pulled out a Taser X2 Defender from the holster attached to his belt, and after two of the other officers threw Stachowiak to the ground, he tased Stachowiak twice. Stachowiak however continued struggling, at one point kicking one of the officers in the shoulder, dislocating it. At 6:17, Stachowiak was finally placed in the police car, which then departed at 6:18.

Detention of witnesses 

Stachowiak's arrest was separately recorded by three bystanders with their mobile phones. Once the police car with Stachowiak drove away, the police tracked down and detained the two of them that were recording the intervention from a closer range and commenting the officers' actions. Both were transported to the same police station as Stachowiak, where they were held for one and a half days. Their mobile phones were confiscated and returned only after over a month.

Interrogation and death 

Stachowiak was transported to a police station at Trzemeska 12. At 6:38 he was led into the building by two police officers and placed in a detention room. The two detained witnesses, and later another man involved in an unassociated case, were subsequently placed in the same room as well. According to the detainees, Stachowiak was mumbling and behaving oddly. Around 6:51 an ambulance was called to the police station for the officer with dislocated shoulder. The first responders that arrived did not come in contact with Stachowiak.

After Stachowiak was led to an interrogation room and interrogated, the officers took him to a toilet room in order to conduct a personal search. The lights in the toilet room were off. There at 8:57 Łukasz Rz. tased Stachowiak three times while the latter was handcuffed and lying on the floor. Around 9:10 Stachowiak was brought back to the detention room, while the other detainees were led out. Another struggle between Stachowiak and the police officers occurred, until one of the officers noticed that Stachowiak is not breathing.

At 9:18 the officers called for an ambulance, which arrived around 9:30. Stachowiak was pronounced dead at 10:24.

Riots 

Protests and riots took place for several days under the police station where Stachowiak died. The glass in the entrance door of the police station was shattered, and the facade of the police station, several police cars and a water cannon were damaged. Three police officers suffered minor injuries. In total, at least 40 people were detained for participation, with two men afterwards sentenced to 4.5 and 4 years of prison. Later 24 more persons were sentenced to between 1.5 years and 6 months of prison, with 13 of the sentences in suspension.

Investigations

Autopsies 

The first autopsy of Stachowiak's body was conducted the day after his death by medical experts from Wrocław. The experts were not able to unequivocally determine the cause of death, however they indicated that Stachowiak's death was most likely due to three factors: having taken high doses of amphetamine, tramadol and a synthetic cathinone; having been repeatedly tased; and having been subject to most likely repeated pressure on the neck.

A second autopsy was conducted by specialists from the Forensic Medicine Department in Poznań one month after Stachowiak's death. The experts found that Stachowiak had broken thyroid cartilage and bruises in the trachea. This autopsy also failed to determine the direct cause of death, however it was difficult to make a reliable assessment because Stachowiak's body was already in a bad condition, the decomposition processes having worn off skin alterations and outer injuries.

Initial investigation 

Despite the presence of several surveillance cameras mounted in the building, no recordings from them were registered inside the police station on 15 May 2016. The only secured recording from them was from the outside of the station. According to Poznań's Regional Prosecutor's Office, the camera surveillance had been out of order. The recordings from the HD camera built into the used Taser X2 Defender, documenting its usage against Stachowiak, were secured on 31 May 2016.

The police conducted two internal investigations. Łukasz Rz., who had tased Stachowiak, had been subject to a disciplinary proceeding, and was suspended in duties for three months. He returned to work afterwards. The other officers that took part in the Stachowiak's arrest and search in the bathroom also continued to work in the police.

Nationwide response 

On 20 May 2017, TVN24 aired a documentary by Wojciech Bojanowski about the death of Igor Stachowiak and the surrounding events as part of its Superwizjer investigative journalism TV series, revealing the previously undisclosed recordings from the camera built into the taser. Day after the airing, the National Police Headquarters released a statement stating that the use of force and taser and the subsequent usage of handcuffs were adequate to the situation and Stachowiak's behavior and that all the circumstances surrounding the arrest were justified. Moreover, according to the statement, the officers were aware who Igor Stachowiak is from his identity card already at the beginning of the intervention and after the officers checked his name in the police database it was revealed that the police had been trying to locate him for an investigation of an extortion of a loan.

On the same day the National Public Prosecutor's Office also released a statement, explaining that the length of the ongoing investigation of Stachowiak's death is due to the realization of motions for evidence made by Stachowiak's parents, and that for that reason it is necessary to obtain opinions of expert witnesses from a specialized forensic laboratory. The statement said that only after the opinions are obtained it will be possible to make an informed decision and bring charges to the suspects, because the evidence obtained so far allows to presume with a high probability that Stachowiak died from cardiorespiratory failure with arrythmia after an episode of excited delirium caused by taking psychoactive drugs, as the forensic examination showed the presence of amphetamine and tramadol.

On 26 May 2017, Tomasz Trawiński, the newly appointed Provincial Police Chief of the Lower Silesian Voivodership, announced the initiation of administrative proceedings towards dismissing five police officers of the Wrocław-Stare Miasto police station. The sixth officer that took part in the activities related to Stachowiak's arrest quit the job in the previous year. Trawiński spoke that the deputy that was present in the police station when Stachowiak died had been dismissed the day before his announcement, that disciplinary proceedings have been initiated against former Wrocław's police chiefs and the deputy, and in addition that a proceeding was initiated against the officer who led the investigation of Stachowiak's death. Trawiński announced that there will be an inspection of camera surveillance in Lower Silesian police units and that surveillance devices will be mounted in every place where interrogations are conducted. Trawiński informed that he will keep the public up to date with the results of the proceedings.

Prosecution of witnesses 
One of the two detained witnesses was fined for using profane words. The other detained witness was charged with assaulting the police officers in order to prevent them from performing their official duties. In December 2016 the investigation against the second witness was discontinued, but in 2018 the case was reopened. Helsinki Foundation for Human Rights filed an amicus brief for the case, arguing that the recording of the arrest constituted journalism. The court acquitted the witness on 30 September 2019, having found no evidence for the crime in the recordings from the mobile phones and city surveillance cameras.

Criminal complaint against Bojanowski 
A criminal complaint was brought against Bojanowski by a group of police trade unionists, accusing Bojanowski of revealing undisclosed information from a criminal proceeding. In consequence, in response to a motion by a prosecutor's office in Warsaw, a court in Warsaw exempted him from his reporter's privilege without summoning him. Bojanowski however successfully appealed the decision. Because Bojanowski acted in public interest and his actions "did not cause harm, but actually [caused] benefit" the proceeding was discontinued by the prosecutor despite meeting the criteria for the crime.

Sentences for the police officers 

On 21 June 2019, the four suspected former police officers were convicted of abusing their positions and physical and psychological abuse of Stachowiak. ŁukaszRz. was sentenced to two years and six months in prison, while PawełG., PawełP. and AdamW. were sentenced to two years in prison. The appellate court upheld the sentences on 19 February 2020, stating that Stachowiak was tortured, however that his death was not caused by the actions of the officers, but by cardiorespiratory failure with arrythmia after an episode of excited delirium caused by taking psychoactive drugs. The former officers started serving their sentences shortly before Easter of the same year. In September 2020, the defenders of Łukasz Rz., Paweł G. and Adam W. filed cassation appeals to the Supreme Court of Poland.

On 22 February 2021, the Polish Ombudsman Adam Bodnar also filed a cassation appeal, requesting for a reconsideration of the case, stating that the courts "did it badly and cursorily" when assessing the responsibility of the police officers, and "minimized the blame" by not deeming the taser as the direct cause of death. In the appeal, Bodnar wrote that the court based its view on the cause of the death on only one expert opinion without investigating whether it is a good explanation in the case of a person that received electric shocks, and that the court did not take into account the opinions of other experts and witnesses that, according to Bodnar, ruled out that Stachowiak was in a state of extreme agitation.

As of 2022, the cassation appeals are still pending in the Supreme Court of Poland.

Reactions 

In an interview for TVN24 on 21 May 2017, Bodnar said that he has "absolutely no doubt" that Igor Stachowiak was tortured and his treatment by the police officers was a "blatant violation of civil rights".

On 29 May 2017, Amnesty International sent an open letter to the Minister of the Interior and Administration Mariusz Błaszczak and the Public Prosecutor General Zbigniew Ziobro, pointing out the overt length of the proceedings regarding Stachowiak's death and pointing out that an unambiguous public promise to hold the involved persons responsible was brought about only after the recordings from the police station were revealed by a TV station. On the basis of these recordings, Amnesty International ascertained that Stachowiak was subject to activities that meet the definition of torture in the Article 1 of the United Nations Convention Against Torture, stating that the police officers used a taser to force confessions and humiliate Stachowiak, that they caused him physical and mental suffering in order to coerce him to a specific behavior, and moreover that using a taser against a handcuffed person was directly in contradiction to Article 25 Paragraph 3 of the Act on the Means of Physical Coercion and Firearms (Ustawa o środkach przymusu bezpośredniego i broni palnej).

In an article for Dziennik.pl, Patryk Słowik criticized National Police Headquarters's statement, commenting that Article 6 of the Act on the Means of Physical Force and Firearms states that force is used in a manner that is necessary to achieve the goals, proportional to the threat level, and choosing the means that possibly cause the lowest affliction. Therefore, in Słowik's opinion, the National Police Headquarters believe that electrocuting a handcuffed man cowering in a bathroom was dictated by him endangering the four officers present in the room. Słowik further accused the police of "lying or exhibiting far-fetching ignorance" by writing that Stachowiak was wanted for an extortion of a loan, whereas in fact, according to Słowik, the police had been only trying to locate him to testify as a witness. Słowik criticized the National Public Prosecutor's Office statement, arguing that running motions for evidence do not preclude applying precautionary measures like suspension in duties and pretrial detention, yet bringing charges is a precondition for that, and furthermore that no legal article requires processing all evidence to bring charges against a suspect.

Łukasz Cieśla and Tomasz Pajączek from Onet.pl criticized the prosecutors and courts for basing their opinion that excited delirium was the cause of death primarily on a testimony of a team of expert witnesses that had never examined Stachowiak's body. In an interview conducted by Cieśla and Pajączek, a psychiatrist and expert witness Artur de Rosier stated that excited delirium is not present in the International Classification of Diseases, that it "does not occur in science", and hence that "[he] does not use it" as an expert witness. Another interviewed psychiatrist, prof. Piotr Gałecki, described excited delirium as a "certain hypothesis, conjecture, attempt to find an answer to the question why people sometimes die during police interventions", because "in the USA it sometimes happened that a correct use of police force resulted in death of the detainee", and that excited delirium "is a certain view, not a firm stance", and that "it is not scientifically confirmed".

See also 

 Killing of Robert Dziekański
 Killing of Kelly Thomas
 Death of Jordan Begley
 Taser safety issues

References 

Police brutality in the 2010s
Police brutality
Deaths in Poland